Viking Gas Transmission is a natural gas pipeline which takes gas from the TransCanada pipeline in Minnesota and brings it to Wisconsin. It is owned by ONEOK Partners. Its FERC code is 82.

See also
 List of North American natural gas pipelines

References

External links
Pipeline Electronic Bulletin Board

Natural gas pipelines in the United States
Natural gas pipelines in Minnesota
Natural gas pipelines in Wisconsin